Ladislav Smolík (born 25 June 1909, date of death unknown) was a Czech rower. He competed in the men's eight event at the 1936 Summer Olympics.

References

External links
 

1909 births
Year of death missing
Czech male rowers
Olympic rowers of Czechoslovakia
Rowers at the 1936 Summer Olympics
Place of birth missing